Claude Ambrose Rogers FRS (1 November 1920 – 5 December 2005) was an English mathematician who worked in analysis and geometry.

Research
Much of his work concerns the Geometry of Numbers, Hausdorff Measures, Analytic Sets, Geometry and Topology of Banach Spaces, Selection Theorems and Finite-dimensional Convex Geometry. In the theory of Banach spaces and summability, he proved the Dvoretzky–Rogers lemma and the Dvoretzky–Rogers theorem, both with Aryeh Dvoretzky. He constructed a counterexample to a conjecture related to the Busemann–Petty problem. In the geometry of numbers, the Rogers bound is a bound for dense packings of spheres.

Awards and honours
Rogers was elected a Fellow of the Royal Society (FRS) in 1959. He won the London Mathematical Society's De Morgan Medal in 1977.

Personal life

Rogers was married to children's writer Joan North. They had two daughters, Jane and Petra.

References

1920 births
2005 deaths
20th-century English mathematicians
21st-century English mathematicians
Functional analysts
Measure theorists
British geometers
Fellows of the Royal Society